The Firebird Z-One is a German single-place, paraglider that was designed and produced by Firebird Sky Sports AG of Füssen in the mid-2000s. It is now out of production.

Design and development
The Z-One was designed as a beginner glider. The models are each named for their relative size.

Variants
Z-One S
Small-sized model for lighter pilots. The glider model is DHV 1 certified.
Z-One M
Mid-sized model for medium-weight pilots. The glider model is DHV 1 certified.
Z-One  L
Large-sized model for heavier pilots. The glider model is DHV 1 certified.

Specifications (Z-One L)

References

Z-One
Paragliders